German submarine U-399 was a Type VIIC U-boat of Nazi Germany's Kriegsmarine during World War II.

She carried out one patrol. She sank one ship and caused another to be declared a total loss.

She was sunk in the English Channel on 26 March 1945.

Design
German Type VIIC submarines were preceded by the shorter Type VIIB submarines. U-399 had a displacement of  when at the surface and  while submerged. She had two shafts and two  propellers.

U-399 was fitted with five  torpedo tubes (four fitted at the bow and one at the stern), fourteen torpedoes, one  SK C/35 naval gun, (220 rounds), one  Flak M42 and two twin  C/30 anti-aircraft guns. The boat had a complement of between forty-four and sixty.

Service history
The submarine was laid down on 12 November 1942 at the Howaldtswerke (yard) at Kiel as yard number 31, launched on 4 December 1943 and commissioned on 22 January 1944 under the command of Oberleutnant zur See Kurt van Meteren.

She served with the 5th U-boat Flotilla from 22 January 1944 and the 11th flotilla from 1 February 1945.

The boat's first patrol was preceded by the short journey from Kiel in Germany to Horten Naval Base (south of Oslo), arriving at the Norwegian port on 28 January 1945.

Patrol and loss
U-399 departed Horten on 6 February 1945. On 21 March, she torpedoed the Liberty ship James Eagan Layne "about twelve miles off Plymouth". The ship was beached at nearby Whitesand Bay but settled on the bottom; at high water, only her masts and funnel showed. She was declared a total loss.

The boat sank the Dutch-registered Pacific on 26 March 1945. This ship had taken part in Operation Dynamo, the Dunkirk evacuation, in 1940.

U-399 was sunk later on the same day by depth charges from the British frigate .

Forty-six men died in U-399; there was one survivor.

Summary of raiding history

References

Bibliography

External links

German Type VIIC submarines
U-boats commissioned in 1944
U-boats sunk in 1945
U-boats sunk by British warships
U-boats sunk by depth charges
1943 ships
Ships built in Kiel
World War II submarines of Germany
Maritime incidents in March 1945